"The Last Defender of Camelot" is a fantasy short story by American writer Roger Zelazny, first published in the Summer 1979 issue of Asimov's SF Adventure Magazine.  It was subsequently published as a chapbook by Underwood/Miller for the May 23, 1980 V-Con 8 where Zelazny was guest of honor. The story was also the basis of a 1986 episode of the television series The Twilight Zone.

Plot
The story concerns Lancelot who has survived to the present day by means of magic.  He must help Morgana le Fay confront Merlin, who is half-mad and attempting to meddle in the affairs of the world.

Lancelot has remained alive since the fall of Camelot, having the appearance of an elderly man but retaining his strength and fighting skills. He has spent his long life seeking the Holy Grail, believing that his immortality is punishment for his sins, and that finding the Grail will end his curse. Lancelot instead learns from Morgana that Merlin is responsible for his condition. Merlin has slept for centuries, but is about to awaken, and intends for Lancelot to be his champion and protector. Morgana warns Lancelot that Merlin will cause great harm in his misguided attempts to right the wrongs of the modern world, and that he must be stopped.

Lancelot finds Merlin and rejuvenates him from his centuries-long sleep with a magic elixir. Lancelot tries to persuade Merlin to desist from his plans, and Merlin removes his spell of immortality from Lancelot. Anticipating Merlin, Lancelot drinks the remainder of the elixir to restore his own youth. Merlin summons a "hollow knight" (a suit of armor animated by a spirit) to kill Lancelot. Morgana defeats Merlin, and Lancelot vanquishes the spirit, but is mortally wounded. As Lancelot dies, he finally sees a vision of the Holy Grail.

Awards and nominations
The story won the 1980 Balrog Award for short fiction.

Adaptations
In 1986, the story was adapted as an episode of the Twilight Zone series.

The short story was adapted to a comic in 1993. Both the adaptation and the illustration were by James Zimmerman.

Sources

External links 
 

1979 short stories
Fantasy short stories
Modern Arthurian fiction
Short fiction about time travel
Short stories by Roger Zelazny
Works originally published in Asimov's Science Fiction
Works based on Merlin